Porkulam  is a village in Thrissur district in the state of Kerala, India.
Dr. B.K. Tapper found old "nannangadies" in a temple compound at Porkulam. In the nannangadies he found human remains, decorated pearls, iron tools and earthen pots which were very similar to those found at Thakshasila, a site which dates back more than 2400 years.

Demographics
 India census, Porkulam had a population of 5903 with 2821 males and 3082 females.

References

Villages in Thrissur district